X56 may refer to:

County Road X56 (Clayton County, Iowa) in McGregor to Pikes Peak State Park
Lockheed Martin X-56, modular unmanned aerial vehicle designed to explore High-Altitude Long Endurance flight technologies